Paul Chervet (20 October 1941 – 16 July 2015) was a Swiss boxer. He competed in the men's flyweight event at the 1960 Summer Olympics. At the 1960 Summer Olympics, he defeated Kicha Poonphol of Thailand by decision in the Round of 32, before losing to Mircea Dobrescu of Romania by knockout in the Round of 16.

References

External links
 

1941 births
2015 deaths
Swiss male boxers
Olympic boxers of Switzerland
Boxers at the 1960 Summer Olympics
Sportspeople from Bern
Flyweight boxers